Konggangxinchengjiangning station (literally Airport New Town Jiangning Station) is a terminal station of Line S1 and an interchange station between Line S1 and Line S7 of the Nanjing Metro.

Exits shown in the metro station are listed below:

References

Railway stations in China opened in 2018
Nanjing Metro stations